Joshua David Macht (born January 16, 1969) is an American publishing executive, journalist, and media commentator. He currently serves as Senior Executive Vice President and Chief Product Innovation Officer of Harvard Business Publishing and will assume the role of Acting CEO on July 1, 2021. He was previously Group Publisher of the Harvard Business Review Group.

Macht joined HBR from TIME magazine where he worked as the Editor and General Manager of TIME.com. He was also the magazine's Technology Editor. Before that, he was a journalist at Inc. magazine where he became the editor and co-founder of Inc.com.

He was born in Boston and attended Wellesley High School. He is a graduate of Bates College and Harvard University.

References

External links

1969 births
Living people
People from Boston
20th-century American journalists
American male journalists
21st-century American journalists
Time (magazine) people
Wellesley High School alumni
Bates College alumni
Harvard University alumni